Magawa (November 2013 – January 2022) was a Gambian pouched rat (Cricetomys ansorgei) that worked as a HeroRAT sniffing out landmines in Cambodia for the non-governmental organization APOPO (in English, Anti-Personnel Landmines Removal Product Development) which trains rats to detect landmines and tuberculosis. Magawa was the most successful landmine-sniffing rat in the organization's history, and received the PDSA Gold Medal in 2020.

Early life
Magawa was born in November 2013 at the APOPO headquarters in the Sokoine University of Agriculture in Morogoro, Tanzania. After being trained to sniff out landmines as a HeroRAT, he was moved to Siem Reap, Cambodia, in 2016 to begin landmine-removal work.

Career
In that time, he found 71 landmines and 38 instances of other unexploded ordnance. Magawa was trained to sniff out TNT in explosives, allowing him to disregard scrap metal that would confuse metal detectors. He was able to search for landmines far faster than humans due to his exceptional sense of smell and light weight, which prevented him from detonating the mines. He received the PDSA Gold Medal on September 25, 2020, for his work, and was the first rat to do so. Magawa was the most successful mine-sniffing rat in APOPO's history when he received his medal, and was described by the program's manager in Cambodia as a "very exceptional rat" upon his retirement.

Retirement and death
Magawa retired from bomb sniffing in June 2021 owing to his old age, as is standard for APOPO's HeroRATs. He spent a number of weeks mentoring 20 newly-recruited rats before ultimately retiring to a life of "snacking on bananas and peanuts". Magawa died peacefully in early January 2022, and was the organization's most successful HeroRAT at the time of his death.

References

2013 animal births
2022 animal deaths
Individual rodents
Mine action
Working animals